Labadze is a Georgian surname. Notable people with the surname include:
Gia Labadze (born 1973), retired Georgian rugby union player
Irakli Labadze (born 1981), Georgian retired professional tennis player

Surnames of Georgian origin
Georgian-language surnames